Yangibozor is an urban-type settlement and seat of Yangibozor District in Xorazm Region in Uzbekistan. Its population is 6,800 (2016).

The Amu Darya flows to the east of the town. Recently, there have been many development projects.

References

Populated places in Xorazm Region
Urban-type settlements in Uzbekistan